Three Spare Wives is a 1962 British comedy film directed by Ernest Morris and starring Susan Stephen, John Hewer, Robin Hunter.
It was based on a play by Talbot Rothwell.

Plot
On the death of his Arabian uncle, George (Robin Hunter) inherits three wives. Problems ensue with his existing wife Susan (Susan Stephen) as well as with the British Foreign Office.

Cast
 Susan Stephen as Susan
 John Hewer as Rupert
 Robin Hunter as George
 Barbara Leake as Mrs Hoensby
 Ferdy Mayne as Fazim Bey
 Gale Sheridan as O'Hara
 Dani Seper as Blini
 Golda Casimir as Fatima
 Tony Doonan as Beckwythe
 Doris Gilmore as Veronica
 Edward Palmer as Mr Probyn
 Norman Wynne as Jocko
 Raymond Rollett as British consul
 Noel Purcell as Sir Hubert
 Neil Wilson as Customs Chief
 Garard Green as Customs officer

References

External links

1962 films
1962 comedy films
British comedy films
Films directed by Ernest Morris
Films shot at New Elstree Studios
1960s English-language films
1960s British films